Mobipocket SA was a French company incorporated in March 2000 that created the .mobi e-book file format and produced the Mobipocket Reader software for mobile phones, personal digital assistants (PDA) and desktop operating systems.

The Mobipocket software package was free and consisted of various publishing and reading tools for PDAs, smartphones, mobile phones, the e-readers Kindle and iLiad, and applications on devices using Symbian, Windows, Palm OS, Java ME and Psion.

Amazon.com bought Mobipocket.com in 2005 and kept it running until October 2016, when it permanently shut down the Mobipocket website and servers.

History 
Amazon.com bought Mobipocket.com in 2005. Amazon's acquisition was believed to be a result of Adobe Systems' announcement that it would no longer sell its eBook-packaging and -serving software.

An alpha release of the Java-based version of the Mobipocket reader became available for cellphones on June 30, 2008. There is also a reader for desktop computers running Microsoft Windows, which also works with computers running Mac OS X or Linux using Wine.

It has been widely reported that since Amazon's acquisition of Mobipocket, software support, user support, and platform growth ended. In December 2011, Amazon reportedly officially notified the book publishers that it was ending support for Mobipocket. The status of Mobipocket digital rights management (DRM) content previously purchased by users remains unclear since no other ebook-reader supports its proprietary DRM method.

On October 31, 2016, Amazon permanently shut down the Mobipocket website and servers.

Design 
The software provides:
A personalized press review using the Mobipocket Web Companion, an automated content extraction tool dedicated to press articles.
eBooks, including for each book a biography of the writer. Each downloaded eBook is registered in the My Mobipocket personal virtual library, from which a user has access to any previously downloaded eBook.
A secure reading system, as a result of the encryption of eBooks using DRM and unique signature, a timestamp added to each book at the time of purchase.

Depending on the device, different functions are available. Those are usually managing of books and their metadata, assigning books to arbitrary categories, auto-scroll, rotate by 90° or 180°, bookmarks, custom hyperlinks within one or between different documents, highlighting, comments and by sketches. When transferring documents to other device types, functions that are not supported on the device will be ignored, but the information one is reading will not be altered or deleted.

Each book has one or two language attribute(s); in the later case it is meant to be a dictionary. As a typical example, reading a book in Fr language, a word may be selected and asked to translate with Fr → En dictionary provided the appropriate dictionary is installed on the reader-device. Dictionaries are always unidirectional so Fr → En dictionary cannot be used in reverse  a separate En → Fr dictionary is needed for that.

Implementations 
There is a reader for personal computers that works with either encrypted or unencrypted Mobipocket books.

Unencrypted Mobipocket books can be read on the Amazon Kindle natively, as well as in Amazon Kindle programs on Mac OS X, iOS devices, Android devices, Windows, and Windows Phone devices. By using third-party programs such as Lexcycle Stanza, calibre or Okular, unencrypted Mobipocket books can also be read on Mac OS X, iOS, Android devices and Linux. Third party tools exist to decrypt encrypted Mobipocket books, allowing them to be read using software that does not support encryption.

A user can thus create documents in the Mobipocket format .mobi (which is the same as the Palm OS format .PRC) and use personal comments, bookmarks, and more on all devices supporting those features. Additionally, Amazon offers a free program called KindleGen that can convert or create documents in the Mobipocket format. This program was, however discontinued in the year 2020. An alternative application, called Kindle Previewer, was launched by Amazon shortly after in replacement of KindleGen with all the same features and more.

User-added information, such as annotations and bookmarks, are kept in separate ".mbp" files by the official Mobipocket Reader and Kindle applications. In October 2012, Amazon also introduced an encrypted variant of the file (".smbp"), preventing access to the information by third-party applications.

Mobipocket has not released a version for Android. Owners of Android devices can download Amazon's Kindle application from the Android App store, which can read .mobi files, though no official Mobipocket reader for the Android platform has been released.

Long term plans for the Mobipocket platform are in question in the wake of Amazon's announcement of the Kindle File Format 8, which moves in the direction of HTML5 and CSS3. As one of the most popular e-readers, the Kindle has great sway in the popularity of e-reader formats.

Legacy 
The Amazon Kindle's AZW format (a.k.a. Kindle File Format) is basically just the Mobipocket format with a slightly different serial number scheme (it uses an asterisk instead of a dollar sign).

In late 2011, the Kindle Fire introduced "Kindle Format 8" (KF8), also known as AZW3 file format that supports a subset of HTML5 and CSS3 features, while acting as a container for a backwards-compatible MOBI content document.

See also 

 Comparison of e-book formats
 List of e-book readers

References

External links 
 
Last available Internet Archive save of the Mobipocket Website.

Amazon (company) acquisitions
French literature websites
French companies established in 2000
Computer file formats
Symbian software
Ebooks
Software companies established in 2000